Pavel Petkov (born 26 June 1990) is a Bulgarian footballer who plays as a midfielder for Balkan Botevgrad.

Career
On 5 March 2012, Petkov made his Lokomotiv and A PFG debut in a 2–0 home win over Lokomotiv Plovdiv.

In December 2016, Petkov joined Tsarsko Selo.

References

External links
 

Bulgarian footballers
1990 births
Living people
Association football midfielders
First Professional Football League (Bulgaria) players
FC Bansko players
FC Lokomotiv 1929 Sofia players
FC Botev Vratsa players
PFC Marek Dupnitsa players
PFC Dobrudzha Dobrich players
FC Tsarsko Selo Sofia players
FC Septemvri Sofia players